The Scania 3-series bus range was introduced by Scania in 1988 and was superseded by the 4-series bus range in 1999.

Model designations
The model designation breakdown is as follows:
Main type
F: chassis with engine located longitudinally in front of the front axle
S: chassis with engine located longitudinally above the front axle
K: chassis with engine located longitudinally behind the rear axle
L: chassis with engine located longitudinally behind the rear axle, inclined 60° leftward
N: chassis with transverse engine located behind the rear axle
CN: complete bus based on N-chassis
CK: complete bus based on K-chassis
CL: complete bus based on L-chassis
Engine series
9: DS9 or DSC9 series 8.5-litre engine
11: DS11 or DSC11 series 11-litre engine
Development code
3: third generation
Chassis type
A: chassis for articulated bus
C: chassis for single-decker, two-axle bus
D: chassis for double-decker bus
N: F-chassis for heavy-duty execution
T: chassis for single-decker or double-decker bus with trailing axle
Steering wheel location
L: left-hand drive
R: right-hand drive
Axle/suspension configuration
A: K-chassis: independent front suspension
B: K-chassis: rigid front axle, N-chassis: independent front suspension
L: N-chassis: rigid front axle

So K113TLA would be a left-hand drive tri-axle coach with independent front suspension, while L113CRL would be a right-hand drive two-axle citybus.

Scania F93/F113
The F93 and F113 chassis had the engine mounted in front of the front axle. These models were not sold in Europe. These were made and sold in Argentina (only the F113) and Brazil (both models).

Scania K93/K113

The K93 and K113 were the most common chassis for coaches, with a longitudinally rear-mounted engine.

It was even available as the rare quad-axle K113TRB in Australia.

Scania L113

Scania N113

Scania S113
The S113 chassis had the engine mounted above the front axle. It was not sold in Europe. The S113 was discontinued in 1993.

References

3-series
Vehicles introduced in 1988
Double-decker buses
Coaches (bus)
Articulated buses
Bus chassis